Samuel Yeboah (born August 8, 1986) is a Ghanaian footballer.

Career

Hapoel Kfar-Saba
Samuel Yeboah played in Hapoel Kfar-Saba and won the Israeli golden shoe award.

Hapoel Tel Aviv 
In the 2008–9 season, Yeboah was very successful scoring 13 goals and also making 3 assists in 30 league games.

In April 2009, it was reported that CSKA Moscow had offered €2.5m to Hapoel Tel Aviv for the young Ghanaian striker. He was also linked with a move to English Premiership newcomers Birmingham City.

KRC Genk 
On 28 December 2009, KRC Genk paid a reported transfer fee of €700,000 for Samuel Yeboah. On 4 January 2010, he signed a contract for 3.5 seasons until 30 June 2013, with an option for one more. He then went on loan to Israeli side Beitar Jerusalem for a season.

International career 
The then 22-year-old made his debut for the national team on 22 November 2008 when the Black Stars were held to a goalless draw by Tunisia. He played his second game for the national side on 11 February 2009 against Egypt, coming up as substitute on the 70th minute. The match ended 2-2.

Honours

Team
Divizia Naţională (1):
2005

Individual
Ghana Premier League: Top Goalscorer
2003-04
Israeli Premier League: Top Goalscorer (15 Goals)
2007-08

References

External links
  Profile and statistics of Samuel Yeboah on One.co.il
 Profile of Samuel Yeboah on GhanaWeb.com
 

Expatriate footballers in Northern Cyprus
1986 births
Living people
Ghanaian footballers
Ghana international footballers
Ghanaian expatriate footballers
FC Sheriff Tiraspol players
Hapoel Kfar Saba F.C. players
Hapoel Tel Aviv F.C. players
Heart of Lions F.C. players
Nea Salamis Famagusta FC players
K.R.C. Genk players
Expatriate footballers in Israel
Ghanaian expatriate sportspeople in Moldova
Expatriate footballers in Moldova
Ghanaian expatriate sportspeople in Israel
Expatriate footballers in Belgium
Expatriate footballers in Cyprus
Israeli Premier League players
Belgian Pro League players
Cypriot First Division players
Association football forwards
Ghana Premier League top scorers